Walsingham Priory was a monastery of Augustinian Canons regular in Walsingham, Norfolk, England seized by the crown at the Dissolution of the Monasteries under King Henry VIII.

The priory is perhaps best known for having housed a Marian shrine with a replica of the house of the Holy Family in Nazareth. Walsingham Abbey Grounds and the Shirehall Museum are opened to the public.

History
The village of Walsingham stands a few miles from the sea in the northern part of Norfolk. Walsingham Priory had its origins in the time of Edward the Confessor, the chapel of Our Lady of Walsingham was confirmed to the Augustinian Canons a century later and enclosed within the priory.

From the first this shrine of Our Lady was a famous place of pilgrimage. 
Hither came the faithful from all parts of England and from the continent until the destruction of the priory by Henry VIII in 1538. 
To this day the main road of the pilgrims through Newmarket, Brandon, and Fakenham is still called the Palmers' Way. 
Many were the gifts of lands, rents, and churches to the canons of Walsingham, and many the miracles wrought at Our Lady's shrine.

Henry III came on a pilgrimage to Walsingham in 1241, Edward I in 1280 and 1296, Edward II in 1315, Henry VI in 1455, Henry VII in 1487, and Henry VIII in 1513.

Erasmus in fulfilment of a vow made a pilgrimage from Cambridge in 1511, and left as his offering a set of Greek verses expressive of his piety. 
Thirteen years later he wrote his colloquy on pilgrimages, wherein the wealth and magnificence of Walsingham are set forth, and some of the reputed miracles rationalized.

In 1537, while the last prior, Richard Vowell, was paying obsequious respect to Cromwell, the sub-prior Nicholas Milcham was charged with conspiring to rebel against the suppression of the lesser monasteries, and on flimsy evidence was convicted of high treason and hanged outside the priory walls.

In July, 1538, Prior Vowell assented to the destruction of Walsingham Priory and assisted the king's commissioners in the removal of the figure of Our Lady, of many of the gold and silver ornaments and in the general spoliation of the shrine. For his ready compliance the prior received a large pension of 100 pounds a year, while fifteen of the canons received pensions varying from 4 pounds to 6 pounds.

The shrine dismantled, and the priory destroyed, its site was sold by order of Henry VIII to one Thomas Sidney for 90 pounds, and a private mansion was subsequently erected on the spot.

The Elizabethan ballad, "A Lament for Walsingham," expresses something of what the faithful felt at the loss of their glorious shrine of Our Lady of Walsingham.  On the other hand, the ballad literature suggests that some pilgrims sought non-religious encounters: Ophelia in Hamlet quotes from lyrics about Walsingham in which a woman asks about her pilgrim lover.

Burials
Bartholomew Burghersh the younger
Thomas Felton (died 1381)

References

Attribution

External links
Official website

Monasteries in Norfolk
Augustinian monasteries in England
1153 establishments in England
Christian monasteries established in the 12th century
1535 disestablishments in England
Monasteries dissolved under the English Reformation
Walsingham